L'Esprit frappeur (French for "ghost" or "poltergeist"), is a French publishing house, specialized in low-cost books.  Before the change to euros, it used to sell its books for 10 or 20 Francs; they now cost between 2,5 euros and 5 euros.  L'Esprit frappeur edits many texts more or less censored for economic or political reasons by larger companies.

A few books published by L'Esprit frappeur 

Daniel Defoe, Libertalia, une utopie pirate (French extract of "Histoire générale des plus fameux pirates"), 
Jean-Luc Einaudi and Maurice Rajsfus, Les Silences de la police - 16 juillet 1942, 17 octobre 1961, 2001,  (about the 1942 Vel' d'Hiv Roundup and the 1961 Paris massacre)
Subcomandante Marcos, Contes Maya, 2001
Jacques Morel, Calendrier des crimes de la France outre-mer, 2001
Benjamin Sehene, Fire under the Cassock, 2005,  (about the 1994 Rwandan genocide)

External links 
 

Book publishing companies of France